The 1995–96 Élite Ligue season was the 75th season of the Élite Ligue, the top level of ice hockey in France. Eight teams participated in the league, and Albatros de Brest won their first league title.

Regular season

Playoffs

External links
Season on hockeyarchives.info

France
1995 in French sport
1995–96 in French ice hockey
Ligue Magnus seasons